Zeddas: Servant of Sheol is an adventure video game developed by Japanese studio Caravan Interactive and published by Synergy Interactive (a subsidiary of Synergy Incorporated) in 1996 for Macintosh, SEGA Saturn, and Windows 3.

Gameplay 

Zeddas: Servant of Sheol is a horror adventure game.

Development and release 

The game was developed using Macromedia Director.

Reception and legacy 

Zeddas: Servant of Sheol was met with mixed critical reception from reviewers. PC JokerMarkus Ziegler deemed it "shitty". Swedish magazine High Score gave it a positive outlook but recommended users writing their own notes when playing, as the game takes time to complete. PC Gamers T. Liam McDonald noted the game's weird visual elements. PC Game CenterAl Giovetti commended the hi res pre rendered graphics, campy and unusual character designs, voice acting, film  like music score and sound design. Hardcore Gaming 101s Tom Davey felt the game put its visual and technological gimmicks over any semblance of gameplay.

The Japanese Sega Saturn conversion titled Horror Tour was also met with mixed reception from critics. Fan reception was mixed as well; readers of the Japanese Sega Saturn Magazine voted to give the Saturn version a 4.7368 out of 10 score, ranking at the number 870 spot, indicating a middling following.

A sequel was released entitled Horror Tour 2, which was followed by Labyrinthe (1998). The third game in the series was rediscovered in 2018 in a file from a private collector on a forum.

Notes

References

External links 

 Zeddas: Servant of Sheol at GameFAQs
 Zeddas: Servant of Sheol at MobyGames

1994 video games
Adventure games
1990s horror video games
Classic Mac OS games
Sega Saturn games
Video games developed in Japan
Windows games